The International János Bolyai Prize of Mathematics is an international prize founded by the Hungarian Academy of Sciences. The prize is named after János Bolyai and is awarded every five years to mathematicians for monographs with important new results in the preceding 10 years.

Medalists 
 1905 –  Henri Poincaré
 1910 –  David Hilbert
 2000 –  Saharon Shelah for his Cardinal Arithmetic, Oxford University Press, 1994. 
 2005 –   Mikhail Gromov for his Metric Structures for Riemannian and Non-Riemannian Spaces, Birkhäuser, 1999. 
 2010 –   Yuri I. Manin for his Frobenius Manifolds, Quantum Cohomology, and Moduli Spaces, American Mathematical Society, 1999. 
 2015 –   Barry Simon for his Orthogonal Polynomials on the Unit Circle, American Mathematical Society, 2005. 
 2020 -  Terence Tao for his Nonlinear Dispersive Equations: Local and Global Analysis, American Mathematical Society, 2006.

See also

 List of mathematics awards

References 

Mathematics awards
Lists of award winners
Awards of the Hungarian Academy of Sciences
Awards established in 1902